The Anatra Anamon was a Russian prototype monoplane fighter built by the A.A. Anatra factory in World War I.

Design 
The Anamon was a single-seat monoplane fighter of slim plywood fuselage and mid-placed trapezoid wing with cut out viewing aperture. The landing gear was similar to that designed for the Anatra D.

Test flights of the Anatra Anamon began June 16, 1916, but pilots complained about the 'long' (150m) takeoff and landing Roll as well as steep gliding. The deep pilot's position also was not appreciated. Improvements were suggested, but after minor damage such plans were axed.

Specifications

References

External links

Anamon
Biplanes
Single-engined tractor aircraft
1910s Russian military reconnaissance aircraft
Military aircraft of World War I
Aircraft first flown in 1916